Submergent coastlines or drowned coastlines are stretches along the coast that have been inundated by the sea by a relative rise in sea levels from either isostacy or eustacy.

Submergent coastline are the opposite of emergent coastlines, which have experienced a relative fall in sea levels.

Many submergent coastlines were formed by the end of the Last Glacial Period (LGP), when glacial retreat caused both global sea level rise and also localised changes to land height.

Features of a submergent coastline include rias, which are drowned river valleys and estuaries, and fjords, which are drowned glaciated valleys.

Notable and illustrative examples of submergent coastlines include:
 Western Norway, famed for its many fjords created by sea level rise at the end of the LGP.
 The Western Coastal Plains of the Indian subcontinent, which includes the estuaries of the Narmada and the Tapti Rivers.
 Southern England and South Wales, caused by a "see-saw" reaction to uplift to the north of Great Britain after glacial retreat redistributed weight on the land, including many substantial rias such as Falmouth Harbour, Plymouth Harbour, Kingsbridge Estuary and Milford Haven.
 The Dalmatian coast, famed for its many small inshore islands, formed by sea level rise in the Mediterranean at the end of the LGP.

References

Coastal and oceanic landforms
Coastal geography